Great Crest may refer to:
Great crested grebe
Great crested newt